Fritzens is a municipality in the district Innsbruck country in Tyrol (Austria). It lies 16 km east of Innsbruck on the left side of the Inn River. The Iron Age Fritzens-Sanzeno culture is named for archaeological finds from the village.

Population

References

External links
 Municipality Fritzens: Official website of the municipality in the Hall-Wattens region

Cities and towns in Innsbruck-Land District